Pleasant Thiele Rowland (born Pleasant Williams Thiele; March 8, 1941) is an American educator, reporter, writer, entrepreneur and philanthropist. Rowland is best known for creating the American Girl brand.  She is also notable for her efforts to redevelop historic properties in Aurora, New York, where she created a partnership with her alma mater Wells College.

She has been married to philanthropist Jerome Frautschi since 1977. Frautschi's family owns Webcrafters printing company.

Early life and early career 
Rowland was born in Chicago and grew up in Bannockburn, a suburb north of Chicago. She is the oldest of three sisters and a brother. Her sister Barbara Whitney Carr is president of the Chicago Horticultural Society. Her father was Edward Thiele, a Chicago advertising executive who eventually became president of the Leo Burnett ad agency.

After graduating from Wells College in 1962, Rowland embarked on the first of several careers. From 1962 to 1968, she was a schoolteacher in several states. She was a news reporter and anchor for the ABC station KGO-TV from 1968 to 1971.

Rowland left that industry to pursue a career as a textbook writer. For several years she was involved in writing and publishing children's textbooks.  She was also the publisher of the Children's Magazine Guide. In the 1970s, Rowland created a comprehensive language arts program, called Beginning to Read, Write, and Listen.  It was informally known as the "letterbooks", and designed to be used for kindergarten and first grade students.  Through the years the program has undergone several revisions and updates.

In 1978, Rowland created Superkids with the aim of making reading education more effective for young students. Today, the Superkids Reading Program remains a phonics-based program that integrates reading, writing, spelling and grammar, and aligns with Common Core state standards. The reading program was purchased by education publisher Zaner-Bloser in 2015 and continues to be used in thousands of classrooms across the U.S.

Career 
In 1986 Rowland founded the Pleasant Company, which manufactured the "American Girl" dolls, books and accessories.  Rowland was inspired to create the American Girl brand because of her longstanding interest in history.  A visit to Colonial Williamsburg led her to think that young girls might become interested in history through identifying with dolls based on historic periods.  Each doll is designed with a story that places it in a specific historical time period.  Books, clothing and other accessories are marketed separately for each doll.

The company's growth was rapid as it added dolls, books, clothing for dolls and girls, and numerous other accessories, such as dollhouses and children's furniture. In marketing synergy, her company created stores in major cities, events, and films planned around the dolls and their accessories. For instance, parents may pay to reserve space at stores for American Girl parties for their daughters and friends.  Stores have public restaurants where mothers and daughters can have tea or other meals.

In 1998 Rowland sold the Pleasant Company (now American Girl) to Mattel for $700 million.  Based in Middleton, Wisconsin, American Girl reached $350 million in sales in 2001. As of 2008, its US sales were second only to the Barbie doll.

In 2001 Rowland purchased bankrupt retailer MacKenzie-Childs, based in Aurora, NY. After Rowland restructured the company's management team in 2006, MacKenzie-Childs became profitable.  In 2008 Rowland sold MacKenzie-Childs to Lee Feldman and Howard Cohen – part owners of Twin Lakes Capital.

In 2003 Rowland founded the nonprofit Rowland Reading Foundation to update and distribute The Superkids Reading Program and to support research into early reading instruction.

On September 22, 2010 Rowland received an Honorary Doctoral Degree of Humane Letters from Edgewood College in Madison, Wisconsin.

Philanthropy 
Rowland and husband Jerome Frautschi are major philanthropists in Madison, Wisconsin.  Frautschi is from the Madison area, where his family has been based for several generations.

They have made substantial contributions to Madison; together, they made one of the largest single contributions, a $250 million gift to build the Overture Center for the Arts, a performing  arts center and museum. (Frautschi is said to have financed the project wholly with personal funds from the sale of his stock in American Girl.)

Rowland has also supported the Chicago Botanic Gardens by establishing a Lakeside Gardens area.

Awards and honors 
Golden Plate Award of the American Academy of Achievement, 1999
The Jane Bradley Pettit Award for Distinction in Philanthropy, 2009
Wisconsin Business Hall of Fame, 2010
Wisconsin Governor's Award
Association of Educational Publishers’ Hall of Fame

Citations

External links 
 Wells College biography of Pleasant Rowland
 Pleasant Company biography for Pleasant Rowland
 CNN article on the Aurora controversy
 Rowland Reading Foundation website

1941 births
Living people
American entertainment industry businesspeople
Philanthropists from New York (state)
Writers from Chicago
Businesspeople from Madison, Wisconsin
Writers from Madison, Wisconsin
Wells College alumni
Philanthropists from Illinois
Toy inventors
American Girl